Gorkha Airlines Pvt. Ltd. was an airline based in Kathmandu, Nepal. It operated scheduled and charter flights to domestic destinations, as well as daily mountain flights in the Himalayas. Its main base was Tribhuvan International Airport in Kathmandu.  The company slogan was Fly With Us The Gallant Way.

History 

The airline was established in 1996 and started operations on 8 July 1996. It began operations with two Mil Mi-17 helicopters and moved on to scheduled flights using fixed-wing aircraft. In 1998, the airline took over two Dornier 228s, which the airline used exclusively after discontinuing helicopter operations in 2005.
The airline ceased to operate in 2008.

In 2017, Gorkha Airlines received the approval from Civil Aviation Ministry to reoperate the Airline. It planned to operate two ERJ twin-engine regional jets produced by Embraer, and two Dornier aircraft on domestic routes. However, by 2020, this did not happen.

Destinations 
Gorkha Airlines regularly served the following destinations, which were cancelled either at the closure of operations or before:

Gorkha Airlines also operated scheduled mountain sightseeing flights from Kathmandu to Mount Everest range. The flights usually departed in the early morning hours and return to the airport one hour later.

Fleet 
At the time of closure, Gorkha Airlines operated the following aircraft:

Former fleet

Accidents and incidents
On 30 June 2005, a Dornier 228 (9N-ACV) aircraft carrying nine passengers and three crew members en route from Kathmandu skidded off the runway while attempting to land at Lukla Airport. The passengers suffered only minor injuries, however, after the accident, the aircraft was withdrawn from service and written off.

References

External links 

  via Wayback Machine

Defunct airlines of Nepal
Airlines established in 1996
1996 establishments in Nepal